Mayo-Kebbi Est is one of the 23 regions of Chad. Its capital is Bongor. It is composed of the northern areas of the former prefecture of Mayo-Kebbi (sub-prefectures of Bongor, Fianga and Gounou Gaya).

Geography
The region borders Chari-Baguirmi Region to the north-east, Tandjilé Region to the south-east, Mayo-Kebbi Ouest Region to the south-west, and Cameroon to the west.

Settlements
The region's capital is Bongor; other major settlements include Djodo Gassa, Fianga, Gam, Gounou Gaya, Guélengdeng, Hollom Gamé, Katoa, Kéra, Kim, Koyom, Moulkou, Nanguigoto, Tikem and Youé. Lake Fianga and Lake Tikem are located in the region.

Demographics
The region's population was 495,339 inhabitants in 1993 and 774,782 in the 2009 census. The main ethnolinguistic groups are the Bagirmi, Kanuri, Kera, Kim, Kwang, Majera, Marba, Masa, Mbara, Musgum, Musey, Ngeté-Herdé peoples, Tobanga and Tupuri.

Subdivisions
The region of Mayo-Kebbi East is divided into four departments:

References

 
Regions of Chad